Eublemma ornatula is a species of moth of the  family Erebidae. It is found in Kenya, Lesotho, Tanzania, South Africa, Uganda,  and Zimbabwe.

Biology
Known hostplant of the larvae is Helianthus annuus.

References

Boletobiinae
Moths of Africa
Moths described in 1874